Newton Heath Railway Station served the district of Newton Heath in east Manchester.  It was opened by the Lancashire and Yorkshire Railway (LYR) on 1 December 1853 and was closed by British Railways on 3 January 1966.

The station buildings were situated on the northwest side of Dean Lane, where that road passed over the LYR line from Manchester Victoria to Rochdale, and 300 yards north of Dean Lane.  It was immediately adjacent to the large LYR Newton Heath steam locomotive shed. The Railway Hotel remains in operation at the former station site.

The area is now served by Newton Heath and Moston tram stop, which opened on 28 February 2013.

References

The Oldham Loop by Jeffrey Wells
The Manchester and Leeds Railway by Martin Bairstow
The Directory of Railway Stations by R.V.J. Butt, PSL, 1995

Disused railway stations in Manchester
Former Lancashire and Yorkshire Railway stations
Beeching closures in England
1853 establishments in England
Railway stations in Great Britain opened in 1853
Railway stations in Great Britain closed in 1966